Gyanpur is a constituency of the Uttar Pradesh Legislative Assembly covering the city of Gyanpur in the Bhadohi district of Uttar Pradesh, India.

Gyanpur is one of five assembly constituencies in the Bhadohi Lok Sabha constituency. Since 2008, this assembly constituency is numbered 393 amongst 403 constituencies.

Election results

2022 
NISHAD Party member Vipul Dubey won in the 2022 Uttar Pradesh Legislative Assembly election, defeating Samajwadi Party candidate, Ram Kishore Bind, by a margin of  6231 votes.

2017
NISHAD Party member Vijay Mishra won in the 2017 state assembly elections defeating Bharatiya Janta Party candidate Mahendra Kumar Bind by a margin of 20,230 votes.

References

External links
 

Assembly constituencies of Uttar Pradesh
Bhadohi district